Arpaia is a town, comune (municipality) and former (now titular) episcopal see in the Province of Benevento in the southern Italian region Campania, located about 35 km northeast of Naples and about 25 km southwest of Benevento.

Arpaia borders the following municipalities: Airola, Forchia, Paolisi and Roccarainola.

History 
Arpaia, rather than present-day Montesarchio, is considered to have been the seat of the ancient Diocese of Caudium (circa 400-600). The see was suppressed in 600, but in 1970 it was formally restored as the Latin Catholic titular see of Caudium.

See also 
 List of Catholic dioceses in Italy
 Caudium
Battle of the Caudine Forks

References

Sources and external links 
 GCatholic - former & titular see = Caudium

Cities and towns in Campania
Articles which contain graphical timelines